Langdale Pike may refer to:

 Langdale Pike, a fictional character in The Adventure of the Three Gables, a Sherlock Holmes story by Sir Arthur Conan Doyle
 Langdale Pikes, a group of peaks in the Lake District